The Bastion Formation is a geologic formation in Greenland. It preserves fossils dating back to the Cambrian period.

See also

 List of fossiliferous stratigraphic units in Greenland

References

External links 
 Mollusc fauna of the Early Cambrian Bastion Formation

Geologic formations of Greenland
Cambrian Greenland
Cambrian southern paleotemperate deposits